Mehdi M. Barsaoui (born 23 May 1984), is a Tunisian filmmaker. He is best known as the director of critically acclaimed shorts and feature films A Son, Sideways and Bobby.

Personal life
He was born on 23 May 1984 in Tunis, Tunisia. He graduated from the Higher Institute of Multimedia Arts of Tunis (ISAMM). After graduation, he moved to Italy and completed his training and graduated from DAMS in Bologna.

Career
During the life in Italy, he directed three short films: Sideways (2010), Bobby (2014) and We Are Just Fine Like This (2016). All three short film received critical acclaim and then selected in several international festivals where they won several prizes. The short We Are Just Fine Like This won the Best Muhr Short award at the Dubai International Film Festival. 

In 2019, he made his directorial debut with the film, Un fils (A Son) which was produced as a collaborative work of Tunisia, France, Lebanon and Qatar. The film had its premiere at the Venice International Film Festival. The film received official selection at the Venice Film Festival 2019, where Sami Bouajila won the award for best actor in the Orizzonti section. At the Filmfest Hamburg, the film won the NDR Young Talent Award. The film also received critical acclaim. In 2020, the film won Prabhat International Award at Pune International Film Festival (PIFF).

Filmography

References

External links
 

Living people
Tunisian film directors
Tunisian screenwriters
1984 births